The Church of the Holy Cross is a Roman Catholic parish located in the city of Nicosia in Cyprus.

The first church dedicated to the Holy Cross was built in 1642 and operated continuously until the late nineteenth century. In April 1900 a new church dedicated to the Holy Cross was financially supported in part by the Spanish Royal Family and partly by the Franciscan friars of the Custody of the Holy Land. Its formal inauguration took place in 1902. It also has a friary which was rebuilt in 1959. Part of the access to the garden was blocked as a consequence of the Cyprus crisis of 1963–64 and the war of 1974, as the church sits in the buffer zone between Nicosia and North Nicosia.

The parish sits within the Latin Patriarchate of Jerusalem.

See also
Roman Catholicism in Cyprus

References

External links
 Holy Cross Catholic Church official website

Roman Catholic churches in Cyprus
Churches in Nicosia
Latin Patriarchate of Jerusalem